"The Greatest Gift" is a 1943 short story written by Philip Van Doren Stern, loosely based on the Charles Dickens 1843 novella A Christmas Carol, which became the basis for the film It's a Wonderful Life (1946). It was self-published as a booklet in 1943 and published as a book in 1944.

The film was nominated for five Oscars and has been recognized by the American Film Institute as one of the 100 best American films ever made, placing number 11 on its initial 1998 greatest movie list and number one on its list of the most inspirational American films of all time.

Plot summary
George Pratt, a man who is dissatisfied with his life, contemplates suicide. As he stands on a bridge on Christmas Eve, he is approached by a strange, unpleasantly dressed but well-mannered man with a bag. The man strikes up a conversation, and George tells the man that he wishes he had never been born. The man tells him that his wish has been granted and that he was never born. The man tells George that he should take the bag with him and pretend to be a door-to-door brush salesman if anyone addresses him.

George returns to his town, and discovers that no one knows him. His friends have taken different and often worse paths through life due to his absence.  His little brother, whom he had saved from death in a swimming accident, perished without George to rescue him. George finds the woman he knows as his wife married to someone else. He offers her a complimentary upholstery brush, but he is forced to leave the house by her husband. Their son pretends to shoot him with a toy cap gun, and shouts, "You're dead. Why won't you die?" 

George returns to the bridge and questions the strange man. The man explains that George wanted more when he had already been given the greatest gift of all: the gift of life.  George digests the lesson and begs the man to return his life. The man agrees. George returns home and finds everything restored to normal. He hugs his wife and tells her that he thought he had lost her. She is confused. As he is about to explain, his hand bumps a brush on the sofa behind him. Without turning around, George knows the brush was the one he had presented to her earlier.

Characters
 George Pratt, a suicidal man, who wishes he was never born
 The Stranger, a strange man, never identified, who grants George's wish and later reclaims it
 Mary Thatcher, George's wife in the original timeline
 James 'Jim' Silva, owner of a real estate company that is selling the bank in the alternate timeline
 Arthur 'Art' Jenkins, Mary's husband in the alternate timeline
 Pa Pratt, George's father
 Ma Pratt, George's mother
 Harry Pratt, George's brother, whose life George saved in the original timeline
 Brownie, Pa and Ma's bulldog
 Marty Jenkins, Arthur's brother, and a thief who stole $50,000 from the bank in the alternate timeline
 Hank Biddle, owner of the maple tree George crashed his car into in the original timeline

History
Stern finished the 4,100 word short story in 1943 after working on it since November 1939. Unable to find a publisher, he sent the 200 copies he had printed as a 21-page booklet to friends as Christmas presents in December 1943.
 
The story came to the attention of RKO Pictures producer David Hempstead, who showed it to actor Cary Grant. Grant became interested in playing the lead role. RKO purchased the motion-picture rights for $10,000 in April 1944. After several screenwriters worked on adaptations, RKO sold the rights to the story in 1945 to Frank Capra's production company for the same $10,000, which he adapted into It's a Wonderful Life.

The story was first published as a book in December 1944, with illustrations by Rafaello Busoni. Stern also sold it to Reader's Scope magazine, which published the story in its December 1944 issue, and to the magazine Good Housekeeping, which published it under the title The Man Who Was Never Born in its January 1945 issue (published in December 1944).

According to the American Film Institute and Turner Classic Movies, Stern did not copyright the story until 1945, when he sold the film rights. Stern renewed the copyright in 1971, the 28th year after the publication of the original December 1943 booklets. Republic Pictures has used the belated copyright on the original story to enforce an indirect copyright on It's a Wonderful Life, which itself lapsed into the public domain in 1975.

Editions
 The greatest gift : a Christmas tale / Philip Van Doren Stern ; with an afterword by Marguerite Stern Robinson ; illustrations by Andrew Davidson, First Simon & Schuster hardcover edition 1943, New York : Simon & Schuster, 2014,

Film
At the suggestion of RKO studio chief Charles Koerner, Frank Capra read The Greatest Gift and immediately saw its film potential. In 1945, RKO, anxious to unload the project, sold the rights to Capra's production company, Liberty Films, which had a nine-film distribution agreement with RKO, for $10,000, and threw in three script adaptations for free. Capra claimed the script was purchased for $50,000. Capra, along with writers Frances Goodrich and Albert Hackett, with Jo Swerling, Michael Wilson, and Dorothy Parker brought in to "polish" the script, turned the story and fragments from the three scripts into a screenplay that Capra renamed It's a Wonderful Life. The script underwent many revisions throughout pre-production and during filming.  Final screenplay credit went to Goodrich, Hackett and Capra, with "additional scenes" by Jo Swerling.

In the film, the main character (renamed George Bailey) was played by James Stewart, the stranger (re-imagined as an angel named Clarence Odbody) was played by Henry Travers, and George's wife (renamed Mary Hatch) was played by Donna Reed. The names for some characters in the film were taken from characters in the story, but given different personalities or roles in the story (e.g., Mr. Potter owned a photography studio in the story, but was a conniving banker in the film). In the reality in which George was never born, Mary never marries in the film, but in the story she marries a man named Art Jenkins.

See also
 List of Christmas-themed literature

References

Further reading

External links 
 The Greatest Gift

1943 short stories
American short stories
Christmas short stories
Short stories adapted into films